Spice and the Devil's Cave is a book by Agnes Hewes that was published in 1930. This piece of historical fiction is a retroactive winner of the Newbery Honor award.

The setting is Lisbon, Portugal in the late 1490s, as Vasco de Gama, Bartholomew Diaz, and Ferdinand Magellan discuss their plans to find the elusive sea route around the Cape of Good Hope, which would enable Portugal to access the spice-rich countries of the Far East.

External links
Spice and the Devil's Cave,  HTML ebook, with illustrations by Lynd Ward, at Celebration of Women Writers

1930 American novels
Children's historical novels
American children's novels
Newbery Honor-winning works
Novels set in Lisbon
Novels set in the 1490s
1930 children's books